2015–16 Hong Kong Senior Challenge Shield (officially known as 2015–16 HKFA Canbo Senior Shield due to sponsorship reasons) is the 114th season of one of the Asian oldest football knockout competitions, Hong Kong Senior Challenge Shield. Only 9 teams enter this edition, with one game being played in First Round before the Quarter-final stage. The competition is only open to teams that play in the 2015–16 Hong Kong Premier League. Eastern won their 10th title on 24 January 2016.

Calendar

Bracket

Bold = winner
* = after extra time, = penalty shootout score

Fixtures and results

First round

Quarter-finals

Semi-finals

Final

External links
 Senior Shield - Hong Kong Football Association

2015-16
Shield
2015–16 domestic association football cups